Diethyl succinate is the diethyl ester of succinate.

It is a colorless liquid with the formula (CH2CO2Et)2 (Et = ethyl). The organic molecule contains two ester groups.  This ester is a versatile chemical intermediate. A colorless liquid, diethyl succinate is formed by Fisher esterification of succinic acid and ethanol.

Reactions
Being a diester, diethyl succinate is a particularly versatile building block.  It participates in acyloin condensation to give 2-hydroxycyclobutanone.  Via condensation with oxalate esters, it serves as a precursor to ketoglutaric acid.

References 

Ethyl esters
Succinate esters